Stephen John Toope  (born February 14, 1958) is a Canadian legal scholar, academic administrator and a scholar specializing in human rights, public international law and international relations.

In April 2013 he announced he was stepping down as University of British Columbia (UBC) president, following an eight-year term. From October 2017 to September 2022, he was vice-chancellor of the University of Cambridge in the United Kingdom.

Education
Toope graduated from Harvard College in 1979 with a bachelor's degree in English Literature and European History. He then received two law degrees – in common law and civil law – from the McGill University Faculty of Law in 1983, where he served as editor-in-chief of the McGill Law Journal. In 1987, he was awarded a Doctorate of Philosophy in arbitration law at Trinity College, Cambridge.

Career
After completing his PhD, Toope joined McGill University's faculty.

He served as dean of McGill University Faculty of Law from 1994 to 1999. He is the youngest person to have held the position. During his tenure as dean, he led the then-largest capital campaign in Canadian law faculty history to build a new Law library, and oversaw the renewal of the faculty's curriculum.

Toope then headed the Trudeau Foundation, named in honor of Canadian Prime Minister Pierre Elliott Trudeau. The Foundation is an independent, private, and non-partisan Canadian educational foundation that focuses on identifying outstanding talent in the social sciences and humanities, thereby building a network to promote public debate on issues of societal importance. The Foundation awards five fellowships and 15 doctoral candidate scholarships annually to recognize outstanding achievement in the humanities and social sciences that exemplify innovative public policy approaches and a commitment to public engagement. Established in 2002, the Foundation manages an endowment of more than C$140 million.

In 2006, Toope became the 12th president and vice-chancellor of the University of British Columbia succeeding Martha Piper. He also held an academic position at the university as a tenured professor of law. He assumed the presidential post on July 1, 2006, and held the position for eight years, until June 30, 2014. On April 3, 2013, it was announced that Toope would leave the UBC presidency effective June 2014 to "pursue academic and professional interests in international law and international relations".

In January 2015, Toope became the director of the University of Toronto's Munk School of Global Affairs.

He was named Officer of the Order of Canada in 2015. 

On October 1, 2017, he became the 346th person to serve as Vice-Chancellor at Cambridge University in England, becoming the first non-Briton to do so. He is concurrently Professor of International Law at the Faculty of Law, a Professorial Fellow of Clare Hall, and an Honorary Fellow of Trinity College.

Toope has been consulted extensively by the Canadian Department of Foreign Affairs and International Trade and the Canadian International Development Agency. He has won publishing awards from the American Society of International Law and the Canadian Tax Foundation.

He has also conducted various human rights seminars for government officials in Canada, Malaysia, Singapore, and Indonesia, and was a member of the UN observer delegation to the first post-apartheid South African elections. He has also served as Research Director, Office of the Special Representative concerning the Royal Commission on Aboriginal People in 1991.

In 2017, he received an honorary doctorate from McGill University.  In 2019, he was elected Fellow of the Royal Society of Canada. 

His service to the community includes serving on the boards of non-governmental organizations that promote human rights and international development, including the Canadian Human Rights Foundation, the World University Service of Canada and the United Nations Working Group on Enforced or Involuntary Disappearances.

In an op-edit, in 2018 he criticized British politicians for "condemning UK universities as broken and in need of market discipline."

In 2019, he received an honorary LLD from the Law Society of Ontario. During his annual university address, in 2020 he announced Cambridge was removing fossil fuel investments from its portfolio. 

On September 20, 2021, he announced he would be stepping down as vice-chancellor of the University of Cambridge, two years short of completing his seven-year term. His last day in the role was September 30, 2022.

In May 2022, he was selected as the 5th President of Canadian Institute for Advanced Research (CIFAR), commencing November 1, 2022.

Personal
Toope took up residence in Cambridge in 2018, along with his wife, Paula Rosen, a speech-language pathologist and musical theatre composer. They have three adult children.

References

1958 births
Living people
Alumni of Trinity College, Cambridge
Canadian Anglicans
Canadian university and college chief executives
Canadian university and college faculty deans
Clerks of the Supreme Court of Canada
Fellows of Clare Hall, Cambridge
Fellows of the Royal Society of Canada
Harvard University alumni
International law scholars
Academic staff of the McGill University Faculty of Law
McGill University Faculty of Law alumni
Officers of the Order of Canada
People from Montreal
Presidents of the University of British Columbia
Academic staff of the University of British Columbia
Members of the Institut de Droit International
McGill Law Journal editors